Ivan Kovalev may refer to:

Ivan Kovalev (cyclist) (born 1986), Russian professional racing cyclist
Ivan Kovalev (politician) (1901–1993), Soviet statesman and military